In Greek mythology, Thaicrucia was the daughter of Proteus and mother of Nympheus by Zeus.

Note

References 

 Pseudo-Clement, Recognitions from Ante-Nicene Library Volume 8, translated by Smith, Rev. Thomas. T. & T. Clark, Edinburgh. 1867. Online version at theoi.com

Mortal women of Zeus
Women in Greek mythology